Sam James Walker (born 1 March 1978) is an English professional golfer.

Career
Walker was born in Birmingham and turned professional in 2000. He came through the ranks, starting his career on the third tier MasterCard Tour before graduating to the Challenge Tour and finally the top level European Tour. He has struggled to establish himself at the highest level, only retaining his card once in 2007 when he finished 80th on the Order of Merit.

Walker has five wins on the second tier Challenge Tour, the first coming in 2006 at the Scottish Challenge and the second in 2010 at the Allianz Open Côtes d'Armor Bretagne. He picked up his third victory in June 2012, reclaiming the Scottish Hydro Challenge. He added two wins in 2016, the Vierumäki Finnish Challenge in August and the Kazakhstan Open in October

Professional wins (6)

Challenge Tour wins (5)

*Note: The 2012 Scottish Hydro Challenge was shortened to 54 holes due to weather.

Challenge Tour playoff record (1–2)

MasterCard Tour wins (1)
2000 Hawkstone Park

Results in major championships

Note: Walker never played in the Masters Tournament or the PGA Championship.

CUT = missed the half-way cut

Team appearances
Amateur
European Boys' Team Championship (representing England): 1996

See also
2006 Challenge Tour graduates
2011 Challenge Tour graduates
2016 Challenge Tour graduates
List of golfers with most Challenge Tour wins

References

External links

English male golfers
European Tour golfers
Sportspeople from Birmingham, West Midlands
1978 births
Living people